Joe Powell (30 June 1868 – 21 January 1945) was an Australian rules footballer who played with Geelong and St Kilda in the Victorian Football League (VFL).

Notes

External links 

1868 births
1945 deaths
Footscray Football Club (VFA) players
Geelong Football Club players
St Kilda Football Club players
Australian rules footballers from Ballarat